The  is a tramcar type operated by Tokyo Metropolitan Bureau of Transportation (Toei) on the Toden Arakawa Line in Tokyo, Japan, since September 2015.

Overview
Broadly based on the earlier 8800 series tramcars introduced in 2009, the 8900 series trams have a more angular external design. A total of eight cars are scheduled to be delivered by the end of fiscal 2016, replacing earlier 7000 series tramcars. The new cars cost approximately 180 million yen each.

Operations
Based at Arakawa Depot, the 8900 series tramcars operate on the sole remaining tram line in Tokyo, the Toden Arakawa Line.

Liveries
The tramcars are finished in a white livery with coloured ends and bodyside stripes. The colours used on individual cars are as follows.

History
The first two cars, orange-liveried 8901 and 8902, were delivered from Alna Sharyo in August 2015. These entered revenue service on 18 September 2015. The next two cars, blue-liveried 8903 and 8904, entered service in December 2015. "Rose red" liveried cars 8905 and 8906 both entered revenue service on 14 March 2016. The last two cars, yellow-liveried 8907 and 8908, were delivered in July 2016, entering revenue service on 29 and 30 July respectively.

References

External links

 Toden rolling stock 

Electric multiple units of Japan
Tokyo Metropolitan Bureau of Transportation
Train-related introductions in 2015
600 V DC multiple units
Alna Sharyo rolling stock